The British Columbia Mountaineering Club (BCMC) is a mountaineering organization, based in Vancouver, British Columbia. Founded on October 28, 1907 as the Vancouver Mountaineering Club, it became one of the centres of Canadian Mountaineering, particularly in the Coast Mountains of British Columbia. Through publication of journals such as The Northern Cordilleran in 1913 and the current bi-annual BC Mountaineer, weekly meetings and trips and a monthly newsletter, the club became a repository and recorder of mountaineering history and culture for the West Coast of Canada.

External links
 Official BCMC web site
 Climbing the clouds Virtual exhibit of British Columbia mountaineering

Climbing organizations
Non-profit organizations based in Vancouver
Clubs and societies in Canada
Mountaineering in Canada